Morum berschaueri is a species of sea snail, a marine gastropod mollusk, in the family Harpidae.

Distribution
This species occurs in Brazil.

References

berschaueri
Gastropods described in 2015